The Ministry of Sports and Youth Affairs is a ministry in the Government of Sri Lanka whose role is to promote the role of sports in Sri Lankan culture and society. As of May 23, 2022, Roshan Ranasinghe is the Minister of Sports and Youth Affairs, an appointment in the Cabinet of Sri Lanka.

History
The ministry was initially created in 1966 to help bring the varied sports initiatives together. as part of the portfolio of the Ministry of Nationalised Services. The first Minister was V. A. Sugathadasa, the first Secretary was Dr. H. S. R. Gunawardena and the first Director was Austin Rajakaruna. In 1970 the Ministry of Parliamentary Affairs and Sports was established. In 1989 this entity was renamed the Ministry of Youth Affairs and Sports and subsequently in 2000 as the Ministry of Tourism and Sports. In 2004 it was called the Ministry of Sports and Youth Affairs, in 2007 the Ministry of Sports and Public Recreation of Sports and finally in 2010 the Ministry of Sports.

As of 2022 it's called the Ministry of Sports and Youth Affairs.

List of Ministers

Parties

References

External links
 Ministry of Sports and Youth Affairs

 
Sports and Youth Affairs
Sports and Youth Affairs